This article records the 2011–2012 season for the Kitchee Sports Club, a Hong Kong soccer club.

Squad

First Team Squad 
As of 5 February 2012

On loan

Stats

Squad Stats
{|class="wikitable" style="text-align: center;"
|-
!width="100"|
!width="60"|League
!width="60"|Challenge Shield
!width="60"|League Cup
!width="60"|FA Cup
!width="60"|AFC Cup
!width="60"|Total Stats
|-
|align=left|Games played    || 11 || 2 || 0 || 0 || 0 || 13
|-
|align=left|Games won       || 8 || 0 || 0 || 0 || 0 || 8
|-
|align=left|Games drawn     || 2 || 1 || 0 || 0 || 0 || 3
|-
|align=left|Games lost      || 1 || 1 || 0 || 0 || 0 || 2
|-
|align=left|Goals for       || 27 || 1 || 0 || 0 || 0 || 28
|-
|align=left|Goals against   || 12 || 2 || 0 || 0 || 0 || 14
|-
|align=left|Players used    || 23 || 16 || 0 || 0 || 0 || 191
|-
|align=left|Yellow cards    || 21 || 11 || 0 || 0 || 0 || 32
|-
|align=left|Red cards       || 1 || 1 || 0 || 0 || 0 || 2
|-

Players Used: Kitchee has used a total of 23 different players in all competitions.

Player Stats

Disciplinary record
Includes all competitive matches. The list is sorted by position, and then shirt number.

Competitions

Overall

First Division League

Classification

Results summary

Results by round

Fixtures and Results

Pre-season

Barclays Asia Trophy

Friendlies

First Division League

Senior Challenge Shield

First round

League Cup

Quarter-final

AFC Cup

Group-stage

Last 16

References 

Hong Kong football clubs 2011–12 season
Kitchee SC seasons